Star Lake is a lake located in Otter Tail County, Minnesota. Star Lake Township, Minnesota is named after the lake because the township contains nearly the entire lake. Public access to the lake is available on Minnesota State Highway 108.

Geography
Star Lake is named so because it consists of a main circular lake with three arms stretching out to resemble points of a star. It is also believed to have been formed by a meteor/space debris upon impact, unlike the majority of the lakes that were created by the glaciers.

The lake drains through a small channel into the slightly larger Dead Lake directly to its southeast.

External links
 Star Lake report at the Minnesota Department of Natural Resources

Lakes of Otter Tail County, Minnesota
Lakes of Minnesota